Prime Minister House is the official residence of Prime Minister of Pakistan. Previously, it was purposed as a think tank in 2018 which will provide policy advice to the government of Pakistan. It is located in Islamabad, Pakistan. 

The think tank shall provide research on governance, development, technology, and climate change. It will give policy advice to the federal cabinet and research advice for the Higher Education Commission.

Previously, it was the Secretariat of the Prime Minister of Pakistan from its establishment in 1968 until 2018. 

In December 2018, it was proposed to convert the residence of the Prime Minister of Pakistan into a research university. In first phase, the Institute of Advanced Studies for the research would be established. In any case, it would not provide degree programs to students but may offer doctorates to promote research in the future. 

The space consists of 800 Kanals and additional 300 Kanals for Prime Minister's Office and had over 500 servants. It was established during the reign of General Ayub Khan.

See also
Prime Minister's Office

References

Prime minister
Palaces in Pakistan

Prime ministerial residences in Pakistan
Buildings and structures in Islamabad 
Continuity of government in Pakistan
Prime Minister's House (Pakistan)
1968 establishments in Pakistan
Buildings and structures completed in 1968

The Prime Minister House of Pakistan is the official residence of the Prime Minister of Pakistan. Located in the capital city of Islamabad, the building serves as the administrative office and official residence of the head of government.

The Prime Minister House was originally built in the late 1960s as a guest house for foreign dignitaries. The building was expanded and renovated over the years to accommodate the increasing needs of the Prime Minister's office. The current building, which was completed in 1992, is a modernist structure that spans over an area of 110 acres and includes the main building, guest houses, and extensive gardens.

The main building of the Prime Minister House consists of a number of offices, conference rooms, reception areas, and living quarters. The interior of the building is decorated with works of art and furnishings that reflect the rich cultural heritage of Pakistan. The building also features state-of-the-art technology and communication systems to facilitate the Prime Minister's work.

The gardens surrounding the Prime Minister House are a popular attraction for visitors. The expansive lawns, colorful flowerbeds, and fountains offer a peaceful retreat from the hustle and bustle of the city. The gardens also serve as a venue for official state functions, including receptions, banquets, and ceremonies.

The Prime Minister House has been the subject of controversy over the years, with some arguing that the building is too extravagant for a country with a struggling economy. In 2018, the newly elected Prime Minister of Pakistan, Imran Khan, announced that he would not be using the Prime Minister House as his residence and that the building would be turned into a university. The decision was made in an effort to reduce government spending and promote education in the country.

Despite the controversy, the Prime Minister House remains an important symbol of the power and authority of the Prime Minister of Pakistan. It is a testament to the country's rich cultural heritage and serves as a reminder of the important role that the Prime Minister plays in shaping the future of the nation.